Tom Nightingale (born 16 May 1998) is a cricketer who plays for Guernsey. He played for Guernsey the 2017 ICC World Cricket League Division Five tournament in South Africa. He has also played for Leicestershire's second XI and club cricket for the Wangaratta & District Cricket Association in Australia. He made his Twenty20 International (T20I) debut for Guernsey against the Isle of Man on 21 August 2020.

References

External links
 

1998 births
Living people
Guernsey cricketers
Place of birth missing (living people)
Guernsey Twenty20 International cricketers